Give Love is a 2009 Hong Kong romantic comedy film directed by Lee Ka Wing and Joe Ma.

Plot
Yat-tong (Bolin Chen) has got a new flatmate named Leslie (Gigi Leung). Unfortunately Leslie soon gets divorced by her husband and is deeply immersed in sorrow. With Yat-tong's company, she breaks away from the sad history and starts her new life. They get along so well that obviously they are turning to be something more than friends, at least everyone around expects that would happen sooner or later. Maybe just a matter of time. However, they have a large barrier. Leslie's ex-husband is the elder brother of Yat-tong. That means, they are indeed ex-in-laws. Truly, this is not just a matter of time then.

Cast
 Gigi Leung as Leslie Chan
 Bolin Chen as Yat-tong
 Shao Bing
 Shaun Tam
 Fan Siu-Wong
 Crystal Cheung, Regen Cheung and Winkie Lai
 Hui Siu-Hung
 Emily Kwan

External links
 
 
 Give Love at the Hong Kong Cinemagic

2009 films
2000s Cantonese-language films
2009 romantic comedy films
Hong Kong romantic comedy films
2000s Hong Kong films